Federico Gonzaga, Cardinal of Monferrato (1540 – 21 February 1565) was an Italian Roman Catholic cardinal and bishop.

Biography

A member of the House of Gonzaga, Gonzaga was born in Mantua, Italy in 1540. He was the posthumous son of Federico II Gonzaga, Duke of Mantua.  His mother was Margaret Paleologa.  He was the nephew of Cardinal Ercole Gonzaga.  He was educated at the University of Bologna.

Pope Pius IV made him a cardinal priest in the consistory of 6 January 1563.  He received the red hat and the titular church of Santa Maria Nova (a deaconry raised pro illa vice to the status of title) on 4 March 1563.

On 4 June 1563 he became administrator of the Diocese of Mantua, with dispensation for not having reached the canonical age.  He was the papal legate in Mantua in 1564.  He was granted the title of Bishop of Mantua on 16 October 1564 but never received consecration as a bishop.

He died in Mantua on 21 February 1565.  He was buried in Mantua Cathedral.

Ancestry

References

1540 births
1565 deaths
Bishops of Mantua
16th-century Italian cardinals
16th-century Italian Roman Catholic bishops
Sons of monarchs